The 2013–14 Football Conference season is the tenth season with the Conference consisting of three divisions and the thirty-fourth season overall. The Conference covers the top two levels of Non-League football in England. The Conference Premier is the fifth highest level of the overall pyramid, whilst the Conference North and Conference South exist at the sixth level. The top team and the winner of the playoff of the Premier division will be promoted to Football League Two, while the bottom four are relegated to the North or South divisions. The champions of the North and South divisions will be promoted to the Premier division, alongside the play-off winners from each division. The bottom three in each of the North and South divisions are relegated to the premier divisions of the Northern Premier League, Isthmian League or Southern League.

Skrill will sponsor the Conference for this season and the divisions will now be known as the Skrill Premier, the Skrill North and the Skrill South. Skrill terminated the sponsorship deal early, meaning a new title sponsor must be found for next season.

Conference Premier

A total of 24 teams contest the division, including 18 sides from last season, two relegated from the Football League Two, two promoted from the Conference North and two promoted from the Conference South. Of the 24 clubs, 14 employed their players as full-time professionals, namely Aldershot, Barnet, Cambridge, Forest Green, Gateshead, Grimsby, Hereford, Kidderminster, Lincoln, Luton, Macclesfield, Salisbury, Tamworth and Wrexham. The remainder were semi-professional, training two or three times a week.

Promotion and relegation
Teams promoted from 2012–13 Conference North
 Chester (League Champions)
 FC Halifax Town (Playoff Winners)

Teams promoted from 2012–13 Conference South
 Welling United (League Champions)
 Salisbury City (Playoff Winners)

Teams relegated from 2012–13 Football League Two
 Barnet
 Aldershot Town

League table

Play-offs

First leg

Second leg

Final

Stadia and locations

Results

Top scorers

Conference North

Promotion and relegation
Teams promoted from 2012–13 Northern Premier League Premier Division
 North Ferriby United (League Champions)
 Hednesford Town (Playoff Winners)

Teams promoted from 2012–13 Southern League Premier Division
 Leamington

Teams relegated from 2012–13 Conference Premier
Stockport County
Barrow
AFC Telford United

On 4 April 2014, the Football Conference confirmed that they had accepted the resignation of Vauxhall Motors from the league and that, as a result, only the bottom two clubs would be relegated.

League table

Play-offs

First leg

Second leg

Final

Stadia and locations

Results

Conference South

Promotion and relegation
Teams promoted from 2012–13 Isthmian League Premier Division
Whitehawk
Concord Rangers

Teams promoted from 2012–13 Southern League Premier Division
 Gosport Borough

Teams relegated from 2012–13 Conference Premier
Ebbsfleet United

Teams transferred from 2012–13 Conference North
Bishop's Stortford

League table

Play-offs

First leg

Second leg

Final

Stadia and locations

Results

References

 
2012-13
5
Eng